Sir Arthur Henry Freeling, 5th Baronet (26 July 1820 – 26 March 1885) was the fifth Surveyor General of South Australia.

Early life
Freeling was the son of John Clayton Freeling and grandson of Sir Francis Freeling, and the elder brother of Sir Sanford Freeling, . In 1848 Freeling married Charlotte Augusta, daughter of Sir Henry Rivers, 9th Rivers baronet.

Career
Freeling enlisted in the Royal Engineers and later served under the South Australian Government as Surveyor-General. In this capacity he did some valuable exploring work in South Australia. He also served as a member of the Executive and Legislative Councils prior to the concession of responsible government.

In March 1857, Freeling was elected to the newly constituted Legislative Council, where he sat until his resignation in August 1859. He was a member of the Finniss Ministry of South Australia as Commissioner of Public Works from October 1856 to March 1857, when he retired rather than relinquish the permanent post of Surveyor-General. In 1861, he retired as Surveyor-General and moved back to England. There, he served as a lieutenant-colonel and a major-general in the Royal Engineers before retiring. In 1871, he became the 5th Baronet of Ford and Hutchings, Sussex.

In 1860, the Victorian government botanist, Ferdinand von Mueller named a newly discovered flowering plant Eremophila freelingii in his honour. The type specimen of the species had been collected by George Charles Hawker on Freeling's expedition to Lake Torrens in South Australia.

Death
Freeling died in England on 26 March 1885. His son Harry succeeded him as the 6th Baronet of Ford and Hutchings, Sussex.

References

1820 births
1885 deaths
People educated at Harrow School
Royal Engineers officers
Surveyors General of South Australia
Baronets in the Baronetage of the United Kingdom